Colonel Michael Anthony Mumford,  is a career officer in the Australian Army, now serving as a part of the Australian Army Reserve.

He came to prominence in 2006:
Commanding Officer, 3rd Battalion, Royal Australian Regiment, from early 2006, with the rank of lieutenant colonel;
As CO of Private Jacob Kovco, the first Australian soldier to die during the Iraq campaign (April 2006);
Commanding 3RAR during:
Operation Anode (Regional Assistance Mission to the Solomon Islands, specifically the Australian response to riots following 2006 general election, April 2006);
Operation Astute responding to riots in East Timor (May–June 2006);

He was promoted to the rank of colonel in late 2013.

Other interests
Mumford is a former Chairman of the Military Christian Fellowship of Australia.

Mumford completed a Masters of Divinity at Malyon College, Brisbane in 2013.

Honours and awards

References

External links
East Timor report, Australian Broadcasting Corporation
Australian Defence Department
Military Christian Fellowship of Australia
It's an Honour Entry

Australian Army officers
Australian military personnel of the Iraq War
Living people
Recipients of the Conspicuous Service Cross (Australia)
University of New England (Australia) alumni
Year of birth missing (living people)